In category theory, a branch of mathematics, a section is a right inverse of some morphism. Dually, a retraction is a left inverse of some morphism.

Every section is a monomorphism (every morphism with a left inverse is left-cancellative), and every retraction is an epimorphism (every morphism with a right inverse is right-cancellative).

In algebra, sections are also called split monomorphisms and retractions are also called split epimorphisms. The synonym coretraction for section is sometimes seen in the literature, although rarely in recent work.

Properties
 A section that is also an epimorphism is an isomorphism. Dually a retraction that is also a monomorphism is an isomorphism.

Terminology
The concept in topology was defined by Karol Borsuk in 1931.

Borsuk's student, Samuel Eilenberg, was with Saunders Mac Lane the founder of category theory, and (as the earliest publications on category theory concerned various topological spaces) one might have expected this term to have initially be used. In fact, their earlier publications, up to, e.g., Mac Lane (1963)'s Homology, used the term right inverse. It was not until 1965 when Eilenberg and John Coleman Moore coined the dual term 'coretraction' that Borsuk's term was lifted to category theory in general.  The term coretraction gave way to the term section by the end of the 1960s.

Both use of left/right inverse and section/retraction are commonly seen in the literature: the former use has the advantage that it is familiar from the theory of semigroups and monoids; the latter is considered less confusing by some because one does not have to think about 'which way around' composition goes, an issue that has become greater with the increasing popularity of the synonym f;g for g∘f.

Examples
In the category of sets, every monomorphism (injective function) with a non-empty domain is a section, and every epimorphism (surjective function) is a retraction; the latter statement is equivalent to the axiom of choice.

In the category of vector spaces over a field K, every monomorphism and every epimorphism splits; this follows from the fact that linear maps can be uniquely defined by specifying their values on a basis.

In the category of abelian groups, the epimorphism Z → Z/2Z which sends every integer to its remainder modulo 2 does not split; in fact the only morphism Z/2Z → Z is the zero map. Similarly, the natural monomorphism Z/2Z → Z/4Z doesn't split even though there is a non-trivial morphism Z/4Z → Z/2Z.

The categorical concept of a section is important in homological algebra, and is also closely related to the notion of a section of a fiber bundle in topology: in the latter case, a section of a fiber bundle is a section of the bundle projection map of the fiber bundle.

Bibliography

See also

Splitting lemma
Inverse function#Left and right inverses
Transversal (combinatorics)

Notes

Category theory
Homological algebra